Muthu may refer to:

 Muthu (film), 1995 Indian Tamil film starring Rajinikanth
M. K. Muthu, an Indian actor, singer and politician 
Muthu Tharanga, a Sri Lankan actress and model 
Leo Muthu, an Indian philanthropist, educationist and businessman 
Michael Muthu, an Indian director, writer and actor 
Muthu Nilavan, an Indian scholar and poet 
Muthu Sivalingam, a Sri Lankan politician 
V. R. Muthu, the CEO of Idhayam oil brand 
Sathyavani Muthu, an Indian politician 
S. Muthu, an Indian social activist 
Muthu Hospital, an orthopedic and trauma care hospital in the city of Madurai 
Thandava Murthy Muthu, is an Indian male weightlifter 
Royappan Antony Muthu, the third Bishop of the Roman Catholic Diocese of Vellore in Tamil Nadu 
Muthu Swamy, an Indo-Fijian politician